Aÿ (also Ay) is a former commune in the Marne department in northeastern France. On 1 January 2016 it was merged into the new commune Aÿ-Champagne.

Champagne
Aÿ is most famous as a centre of the production of Champagne. Aÿ's vineyards are located in the Vallée de la Marne subregion of Champagne, and are classified as Grand Cru (100%) in the Champagne vineyard classification. The vineyards, harvest huts, presses, and cellars in the region were inscribed on the UNESCO World Heritage List in 2015 as part of the Champagne hillsides, houses and cellars site, because of the region's testimony to the development of champagne. Many prestigious Champagne houses own vineyards in the immediate vicinity, and several producers are located in Aÿ, including Ayala and Bollinger.

International relations
Aÿ is twinned with:
Besigheim, Germany
Newton Abbot, England
Quaregnon, Belgium
Sinalunga, Italy - since 2004

Personalities
Aÿ was the birthplace of:
Denise Schmandt-Besserat (1933-- ), French American cognitive archaeologist and art history professor
Lucien Berland (1888–1962), entomologist and arachnologist
René Lalique (1860–1945), glass designer
Stephen Rochefontaine (1755–1814), military engineer
Albert Lemaître, sporting motorist in 1890s and 1900s

Aÿ was the home of:
Juan Romero (1919-2020), Spanish Legion d'Honneur recipient, anti-fascist Spanish Civil War veteran, and last survivor of the Nazis' Mauthausen concentration camp

See also
Bollinger
Champagne Krug
Classification of Champagne vineyards
Communes of the Marne department
List of short place names

References

Former communes of Marne (department)
Grand Cru Champagne villages